Master Blasters is an American game show that debuted on July 27, 2005. A team of challengers competes against the home team, the Master Blasters, each week to construct rocket-based machines in a timed competition. The series premiered on the Sci Fi Channel in 2005 but ran only four episodes of Master Blasters in 2005, then dropped the series. The Discovery Channel has picked it up and is currently being shown on the Science Channel. The show was filmed primarily at Northwest Regional Airport in Roanoke, Texas.

Cast
Dan Stroud as "Mad Scientist", Team Leader, Master Blasters Team
Terry Stroud as "The Brain", Engineering and Design, Master Blasters Team

The remaining members of the Master Blasters Team are rotated each week.

Episode list

References

External links
 
First Television
The Science Channel

2000s American game shows
2005 American television series debuts
2008 American television series endings
Science Channel original programming
Syfy original programming
Television shows filmed in Texas
Television shows set in Texas